Fernando Soto (15 April 1911 - 11 May 1980) was a Mexican actor. He appeared in more than one hundred films from 1938 to 1977.

Selected filmography

References

External links 

1911 births
1980 deaths
Mexican male film actors